Latvia participated in 1994 Winter Paralympics in Lillehammer, Norway.

See also
1994 Winter Paralympics
Latvia at the 1994 Winter Olympics

External links
International Paralympic Committee
Latvian Paralympic Committee

Nations at the 1994 Winter Paralympics
1994
Paralympics